Mount Glenn,  is in the Coronado National Forest, about  east of Tucson, Arizona. The summit, in Cochise County, is the highest point in the Dragoon Mountains and is a popular local hiking destination.

See also 
 List of mountains and hills of Arizona by height

References

External links 
 
 

Landforms of Cochise County, Arizona
Glenn
Mountains of Cochise County, Arizona